Casate Ticino ("Casá", in the local dialect) is an Italian village in the municipality of Bernate Ticino, near Milan, in Lombardy. As of 2009 its population was of 1,100 circa.

History

Overview
Casate is first mentioned in 1603, in "Atti della visita pastorale" of Cardinal Federico Borromeo.

At the end of 1600 the abbot Ferdinand Crivelli decided to build a church, for the peasants of the small village.
The church was consecrated in 1705, and a plaque still reads as set out in the place of worship:

QUO FACILIUS CULTORES AGRI
CIRCUMIECTI INTERESSENT REI SACRAE
ABBAS GENTIS CRIBELLIAE EX IURE PATRONAT(U)S
AEDEM VIRGINI MAGNAE SINE LABE CONCEPTAE
ANNO MDCCV
DEDICABAT

Origins of the name
The name "Casate" probably derives from common term "casates", farmhouses scattered in fields, in the dialect of the 1600–1700.

Geography

Position
Casate is located east of Ticino river and west of Milan, seat of the province, which is 27 km far from the village.

The village borders are north to Cuggiono, east to Mesero, south and west with the town of Bernate Ticino.

References

External links
 Official WebSite of Municipality of Bernate Ticino
 Unofficial Website about Casate Ticino and its Parish

Frazioni of the Province of Milan